"Young Grow Old" is a bonus track from the European exclusive two-disc special edition of American rock band Creed's 1999 album Human Clay. It is one of the heavier tracks on the album and one of Creed's heaviest songs. Though never released as a single, the song was featured on the WWF Forceable Entry compilation soundtrack in 2002 and Creed's second compilation album, With Arms Wide Open: A Retrospective, in 2015.

References

External links
Details of Creed's albums

Creed (band) songs
1999 songs
Songs written by Scott Stapp